A Time to Gather Stones is a 2005 Russian war film directed by Aleksei Karelin.

Plot 
The film takes place in post-war Russia. German lieutenant Onesorg wants to atone for his guilt. Captain Demin lost his family and health and, due to circumstances, was forced to cooperate with the German.

Cast 
 David Bunners as Ohnesorg (as David C. Bunners)
 Vladimir Vdovichenkov as Captain Demin
 Olga Krasko as Nela
 Andrey Fedortsov as Vasily Muhin
 Vladimir Menshov as General

References

External links 
 

2005 films
2000s Russian-language films
Russian war films